Will Work for Food is a Food Network show starring Adam Gertler, one of three finalists of the fourth season of The Next Food Network Star. The show premiered on Monday, January 19, 2009 at 8:30 PM EDT. According to Food Network, the series "exposes Adam to the world of little-known food jobs as he fearlessly puts his life – and mouth – on the line to try them all! Whether taking honey from three million bees, sculpting ice with a chain saw, foraging for truffles, or digging a wine cave, Adam will do anything in the name of food." The concept is somewhat similar to the Food Network program Glutton for Punishment. In each episode, Gertler featured two food related jobs.

Episodes

External links
Food Network Will Work for Food Website

Authentic Entertainment's Official Site

References

Food Network original programming
2009 American television series debuts
2009 American television series endings
Television series by Authentic Entertainment